The Sunday Mail Young Scot Awards or Young Scot Awards are an annual award ceremony hosted by Young Scot and Sunday Mail to honour young people in Scotland for considerable achievements and positive contributions to charity or their community. The first ceremony was held in 2006, and was hosted by Andrea McLean. Between 2015 and 2017, the awards were hosted by Edith Bowman. In 2018, the event was hosted by Iain Stirling at the SEC Armadillo in Glasgow. No event was held in 2019 and the 2020 event was hosted by Gemma Cairney online due to the COVID-19 pandemic.

Annual ceremony
The ceremony takes place normally in April or May. The call for entries begins in February. The Young Scot bus, partnered with Megabus since 2013 will travel around Scotland promoting the awards, and collecting nominations, which can also be submitted on the Young Scot website.

The ceremony is annually attended by celebrities and prominent politicians, who will present awards or perform. Guests at past ceremonies have included Alesha Dixon, Olly Murs, Shayne Ward, Jack McConnell, Elaine C. Smith, Ashley and Pudsey, Conor Maynard, Stevie McCrorie, Ross Murdoch, the cast from River City and Nicholas McDonald.

Awards categories

Notable winners and finalists of past Young Scot Awards include Amy Macdonald, Karen Gillan, Andy Murray, Paolo Nutini, Martin Compston, Nina Nesbitt, Lewis MacDougall, Paul Brannigan, Laura Muir, Iona Fyfe and Jordan Daly.

Events and venues

In 2007, the ceremony was held in Glasgow's Old Fruitmarket. In 2010 and 2011, it was held in Glasgow's Hilton Hotel. In 2015, for its 10th year, the ceremony was held in the Usher Hall, Edinburgh. The 2016 and 2017 ceremonies were held in the Edinburgh International Conference Centre and the Clyde Auditorium in Glasgow respectively.

References

External links
 
 Young Scot Official YouTube Channel

Annual events in the United Kingdom
Awards established in 2006
2006 establishments in the United Kingdom